Sporopodium awasthianum is a species of foliicolous (leaf-dwelling) lichen in the family Roccellaceae. Found in India, it was formally described as a new species in 2008 by Krishna Pal Singh and Athokpam Pinokiyo. The lichen has a finely verrucose (warty) thallus with whitish-pale to greyish green or brownish verrucae, a white hypothallus (when present), and colourless, muriform (chambered) ascospores that measure 50–85 by 15–20 μm. The specific epithet awasthianum honours Indian lichenologist Dharani Dhar Awasthi, who, according to the authors, "has made valuable contributions to Indian lichenology, and who is still continuing his efforts towards the development of lichenology in India".

References

Pilocarpaceae
Lichen species
Lichens described in 2008
Lichens of India